The following is the list of squads that took place in the men's field hockey tournament at the 1976 Summer Olympics.

Group A

Argentina
The following players represented Argentina:

Coach: Mario Ranalli

Australia
The following players represented Australia:

Coach: Mervyn Adams

Canada
The following players represented Canada:

Coach: Errol Hartley

India
The following players represented India:

Coach: Gurbachan Singh

Malaysia
The following players represented Malaysia:

Coach: Mohamed Sidek Othman Encik

Netherlands
The following players represented the Netherlands:

Coach: Wim van Heunen

Group B

Belgium
The following players represented Belgium:

Coach:  Ernst Willig

New Zealand
The following players represented New Zealand:

Coach: Ross Gillespie

Pakistan
The following players represented Pakistan:

Coach: Saeed Anwar

Spain
The following players represented Spain:

Coach:  Horst Wein

West Germany
The following players represented West Germany:

Coach: Klaus Kleiter

References

Squads
1976